This engagement should not be confused with the 1879  Battle of Ojo Caliente between Victorio's band and the 9th Cavalry.
The Battle of Ojo Caliente Canyon, or simply the Battle of Ojo Caliente was an engagement of the Jicarilla War on April 8, 1854. Combatants were Jicarilla Apache warriors, and their Ute allies, against the United States Army. The skirmish was fought as result of the pursuit of the Jicarilla after the Battle of Cieneguilla just over a week earlier.

See also
Navajo Wars
Apache Scouts

References

Bibliography
 Utley, Robert M.. Frontiersmen in Blue: The United States Army and the Indian, 1848-1865, University of Nebraska Press. .
 Gorenfeld, Will, The Battle of Cieneguilla, Wild West magazine, Feb., 2008
 Bennett, James A., Forts & Forays: A dragoon in New Mexico, 1850–1856, University of New Mexico Press, Albuquerque, 1996, p 53 
 Carolyn, Larry E.. ''FORT UNION: Chapter Three: Military Operations Before the Civil War

Ojo Caliente Canyon
Ojo Caliente Canyon
Ojo Caliente Canyon
New Mexico Territory
Ojo Caliente Canyon
Ojo Caliente Canyon
Ojo Caliente Canyon
Ojo Caliente Canyon
1854 in New Mexico Territory
April 1854 events
Jicarilla Apache